Samad Ali Mallik (born 30 September 1994) is an Indian professional footballer who plays as a defender for Mohammedan in the I-League.

Career
Mallik started his career with then Calcutta Football League third division side, NBP Rainbow, before signing for East Bengal He played for East Bengal in the Calcutta Football League. He made his professional debut for the club on 10 January 2016 in the I-League against Sporting Goa. He started the match and played the full match as East Bengal won 3–1.

Career statistics

Club

Honours

India U23
 South Asian Games Silver medal: 2016

References

Living people
People from Hooghly district
Indian footballers
India youth international footballers
East Bengal Club players
Association football defenders
Footballers from West Bengal
I-League players
1994 births
RoundGlass Punjab FC players
Sreenidi Deccan FC players
Mohammedan SC (Kolkata) players
South Asian Games silver medalists for India
South Asian Games medalists in football